Dennis Weathersby (born June 16, 1980) is a former NFL cornerback for the Cincinnati Bengals.

College career
Weathersby played in college for Oregon State University. At OSU he started 45 games, and set a school record of 57 passes deflected.  He was named to the Pac-10 All-Academic team 4 consecutive years.

Professional career

Weathersby was projected to be drafted in the first or second round of the 2003 NFL Draft. On April 20, 2003, only three days before the NFL draft, he was shot in the back in an apparent gang-related shooting when he and his friend were mistaken for gang members by the Du Roc Crips.  Despite the incident, the Bengals still drafted him in the fourth round joining his former Oregon State teammates Chad Johnson and T. J.  Houshmandzadeh who were also drafted. He survived and recovered from the shooting, but his injuries took longer than expected to heal and he only played in four games his rookie season.

On April 12, 2004, he was involved in a car accident that put him into a coma. He eventually came out of the coma and made such progress as to astound his doctors. The first sign that he might recover was when he was still supposedly unconscious and was visited by Bengals coach Marvin Lewis. His foot was hanging from his hospital bed, and when Lewis told him to put it back in the bed, Weathersby promptly put it back in his bed. The Bengals, believing that he would never play football again, cut him before the 2005 season.

It was reported by ESPN that doctors cleared him to resume work on May 17, 2006, and Weathersby announced plans to attempt a comeback to the NFL. In March 2008, he stated that he did not want to put himself at risk for a hit that could reverse the damage, as well as a desire to "follow God's will" and stepped away from professional football. He stated that he was preparing for his CBEST test (to become a teacher) and has passed the first set of tests in the application process for the City of Los Angeles Fire Department.

References

Weathersby, Dennis
Weathersby, Dennis
Weathersby, Dennis
Weathersby, Dennis
Weathersby, Dennis
People from Glendora, California
Sportspeople from Los Angeles County, California
Players of American football from California